Giovanni Angelo Gavagnin  (15 September 1936 – 3 March 2013) was an Italian professional basketball player and coach. In 2009, he was inducted into the Italian Basketball Hall of Fame.

Club career
During his pro club career, Gavagnin won the 1969–70 season's FIBA Saporta Cup championship.

National team career
Gavagnin was a part of the senior Italian national basketball teams that finished in fourth and fifth place at the 1960 and 1964 Summer Olympics, respectively.

References

External links

FIBA Profile

1936 births
2013 deaths
Olympic basketball players of Italy
Basketball players at the 1960 Summer Olympics
Basketball players at the 1964 Summer Olympics
Centers (basketball)
Italian basketball coaches
Italian men's basketball players
1963 FIBA World Championship players
Juvecaserta Basket coaches
Juvecaserta Basket players
Pallacanestro Varese coaches
Pallacanestro Varese players
Partenope Napoli Basket coaches
Partenope Napoli Basket players